Ramat HaSharon (lit. Sharon Heights) is a city located on Israel's central coastal strip in the south of the Sharon region, bordering Tel Aviv to the south, Hod HaSharon to the east, and Herzliya and Kibbutz Glil Yam to the north. It is part of the Tel Aviv District, within the Gush Dan metropolitan area.

History

Ramat HaSharon, originally Ir Shalom (lit. City of Peace), was a moshava established in 1923 by olim from Poland. It was built on 2,000 dunams of land purchased for 5 Egyptian pounds per dunam. In the 1931 census, the village had a population of 312.

In 1932, the community was renamed Kfar Ramat HaSharon (Heights of Sharon Village).  By 1950, the population was up to 900.  Rapid population growth in the 1960s and 70s led to construction of many new roadways, schools and parks. Several distinct neighborhood evolved in the 1970s, including Morasha on the southern edge, one with many military and air force personnel in the eastern edge, and many successful professionals moved into the developing city. Ramat HaSharon became a highly desirable place to live in the 1980s as a very safe place, containing many gardens and wide boulevards, and attracting many upper middle class suburban families.

While qualifying for city status by number of residents (with more than 30 thousand residents) from the 1980s, Ramat HaSharon's mayors preferred to maintain the local council designation and acted to maintain the character of the settlement by limiting development. In 2002, Ramat HaSharon was granted city status.

2021 archaeological discoveries 
In August 2021, Israeli archaeologists led by Yoav Arbel, have announced the discovery of Byzantine-era wine press paved with a mosaic along with an old coin minted by Emperor Heraclius. According to coin expert Robert Kool, one side of the gold depicted the emperor and his two sons, while the other side depicted the hill of Golgotha in Jerusalem. A Greek or Arabic inscription was engraved on the surface of the coins, probably with the name of the coin owner. According to Yoel Arbel, stone mortars and millstones were used to grind barley and wheat and very likely also to crush herbs and healing plants.

Geography
The main portion of the city is located north of Highway 5, east of Highway 20 and Glil Yam, to the west of the Israel Military Industries factory and Highway 4, and to the south of Herzliya. The city's administrative boundaries extend, however, in a L shaped fashion to the south of highway 5 and bordering with Tel Aviv reaching until Highway 2 in the west.

The Neve-Gan neighborhood is disconnected from the rest of the city and is located to the south of the main city, and is adjacent to Kiryat Shaul Cemetery Tel Aviv's Tel Baruch. The Israel Tennis Centers is also south of route 5. The Cinema city commercial complex is similarly disconnected from the city and is located on the intersection of highway 5 and 2.

Future major development is planned:
 In the fields "Pi Glilot" area, where a gas terminal was previously located, adjacent to Tel Aviv.
 On the site of military bases with plans for relocation north of "Pi Glilot".
 On the Israel Military Industries factory site, which is planned to be relocated.

Economy

Until the 1960s, it was primarily a farming community,  known for its strawberry fields and citrus groves. Ramat HaSharon is also home to Israel Military Industries, the manufacturer of weapons and small arms for the Israel Defense Forces and the world market.

Education 
Ramat Hasharon has seven elementary schools, two middle schools (Alumim, and Kelman), and two high schools (Rothberg, and Alon) . Midrasha LoOmanut, an art teachers training college, and Rimon School of Jazz and Contemporary Music are located in the city. The Geology Museum is located in a Bauhaus style building built in 1945.

Sports
Ramat HaSharon is home to the Israel Tennis Center, founded in 1975, which hosts and organizes international, national and regional tennis tournaments. The courts are also widely used during the Maccabiah Games. The ATP World Tour, which had been in Israel from 1987 to 1996, was scheduled to return to the Israel Tennis Center in September 2014 with the Negev Israel Open, but the event was cancelled because of the military conflict in the region. Along with tennis facilities, which include 24 illuminated courts, and stands which seat up to 4,500 spectators, the central management of the organization, which manages 13 other tennis centers around the country, is located in the town. It also is home to Canada Stadium, where most Davis Cup and other significant Israeli matches have been played since the mid-1970s.

"Herbalife Ramat HaSharon" is the city's women basketball team, one of the leading teams in the Israeli league and a former European champion. The city's football team, Hapoel Ramat HaSharon, plays in Ligat Ha'al, the premiere league of Israeli football. "Alumim", one of the city's junior high schools, has won many trophies in sports, especially for  achievements in track and field.

Notable people

 Chava Alberstein, singer, lyricist, composer, and musical arranger
Mark Azbel, physicist and human rights defender
 Haim Bar-Lev, Israel Defense Forces Chief of Staff and government minister
 Niv Berkowitz (born 1986), basketball player
 Gilad Bloom (born 1967), tennis player
 Mike Burstyn, American actor
 Amnon Dankner (1946–2013), newspaper editor and author
 Orna Donath (born 1976), academic and activist
 Shay Doron (born 1985), WNBA basketball guard (New York Liberty)
 Amit Farkash (born 1989), Canadian-born Israeli actress and singer 
 Yehoram Gaon, singer, actor, director, producer, and TV and radio host
 Julia Glushko (born 1990), tennis player
 Gidi Gov, singer, TV host, entertainer, and actor
 Rami Kleinstein, singer and composer
 Uri Levine (born 1965), entrepreneur who co-founded Waze
 Harel Levy (born 1978), tennis player and Davis Cup team captain; highest world singles ranking # 30
 Sivan Levy (born 1987), singer-songwriter, filmmaker, and actress
 Gigi Levy-Weiss, businessman
 Amos Mansdorf (born 1965), tennis player; highest world singles ranking # 18
 Doron Medalie (born 1977), songwriter, composer and artistic director
 Gal Mekel (born 1988), played for the Dallas Mavericks of the NBA, former NCAA basketball player at Wichita State, 2-time (2011, 2013) Israeli Basketball Super League MVP
 Haim Moshe, singer
 Yael Naim, French-born singer
 Orna Ostfeld (born 1952), basketball player and coach
 Svika Pick, singer and composer
 Haim Ramon, member of the Knesset and Vice Prime Minister
 Lior Raz (born 1971), actor and screenwriter
 Rita, singer and actress
 Anna Smashnova, tennis player
 Guy Solomon (born 1977), football goalkeeper
 Dudu Topaz, comedian, actor, author, and TV and radio host
 Ezer Weizman, commander of the Israeli Air Force, Minister of Defense, and President of Israel
 Shelly Yachimovich (born 1960), politician
 Eli Yatzpan, TV host and comedian
 Rehavam Zeevi, general, politician, and historian
 Yuval Zellner (born 1978), politician
 Naor Zion, comedian, actor, writer and director
 Roy Davidovitch professional Fortnite and Minecraft player.

Twin towns — sister cities
Ramat HaSharon is twinned with:
  Dunkerque, France (since 15 September 1997)
  Saint-Maur-des-Fossés, France  
  Georgsmarienhütte, Germany
  Tallahassee, Florida, United States

See also 

 Archaeology of Israel
 2021 in archaeology

References

External links

 Ramat HaSharon Municipality

 
Cities in Tel Aviv District
Cities in Israel
Sharon plain
Populated places established in 1923
1923 establishments in Mandatory Palestine